Victoria bus station is a bus station outside London Victoria station. It is managed only by Transport for London. In 1970, work commenced on a substantial roof canopy. This was demolished in April 2003 as part of the station's refurbishment.

Routes 38, 390 and 507 terminate within the bus station while others pass through. Many other routes pass by on adjoining streets but do not enter the bus station.

References

External links

Bus stations in London
Transport in the City of Westminster
Bus station